A variety of religious awards has been presented to comics at the Angoulême International Comics Festival between 1985 and 2003. This award is granted by religious organizations or newspapers and it is not part of the official festival.

1980s
 1985: Christian testimony award: Le Transperceneige by Jean-Marc Rochette and Jacques Lob, Casterman
 1986: Christian testimony award: Sang d'Arménie by Guy Vidal and Florenci Clavé
 1987: Christian testimony award: Route vers l'enfer by Daniel Goossens
 1987: Christian comic award: Raoul Follereau: Le vagabond de la charité by Bruno Le Sourd
 1988: Christian testimony award: Maus: un survivant raconte by Art Spiegelman, Flammarion
 1988: Christian comic award: Les fumées bleues du Caire by Jean Duverdier and Michèle Blimer
 1989: Christian testimony award: Ramadan by Farid Boudjellal
 1989: Christian comic award: Mathilde Wrede by Carmen Levi and Alex Lochen

1990s
 1990: Christian testimony award: Afrikaans bazaar by Jean-Louis Tripp
 1990: Christian comic award: Broussaille: La nuit du chat by Frank Pé and Bom, Dupuis
 1991: Christian comic award: Melmoth by Marc-Renier and Rodolphe
 1992: Christian comic award: Ignace, nous n'irons plus à Jérusalem by Cécile Schmitz and Jacques Stoquart
 1992: Christian comic youth award: Yasuda by Martin Ryelandt and Jung
 (1993: no awards in this category)
 1994: Oecumenic jury award: Tonnerre en Chine by  Luc Foccroulle and Dominique Bar, Coccinelle BD (according to ToutenBD) /  Mademoiselle Louise volume 1 by André Geerts and Sergio Salma, Casterman (according to newspapers reporting on the death of Geerts)
 1995: Oecumenic jury award:  Le Centenaire by Jacques Ferrandez, Casterman
 (1996: no awards in this category)
 (1997: no awards in this category)
 (1998: no awards in this category)
 (1999: no awards in this category)

2000s
 2000: Oecumenic jury award:  La terre sans mal by Emmanuel Lepage and Anne Sibran, Dupuis
 2000: Christian comic award: La Bible by Jeff Anderson and Mike Maddox, Pre-au Clerc
 2001: Oecumenic jury award:  Le Journal de mon père part 3 by Jiro Taniguchi, Casterman
 2002: Oecumenic jury award:  Amours Fragiles: Le dernier printemps by Jean-Michel Beuriot and Philippe Richelle, Casterman
 Special mention: Un Ilot de bonheur by Christophe Chabouté, Éditions Paquet
 2003: Christian comic award:  Voyage vers Léon IX by Francis Keller and Thierry Wintzner, Editions du Signe
 Special mention: Auriac by Marco Venanzi and Benoît Despas, Coccinelle BD
 2003: Oecumenic jury award:  Le Chat du Rabin part 1 by Joann Sfar, Dargaud
 Special mention: Petit Polio by Farid Boudjellal, Soleil

References
 ToutenBD list of all winners of all Angoulême awards

Angoulême International Comics Festival